Elections to Rossendale Borough Council were held on 6 May 1999.  One third of the council was up for election and the Labour Party stayed in overall control of the council.

After the election, the composition of the council was:
Labour 21
Conservative 15

Election result

References
1999 Rossendale election result
ELECTIONS: Almost there as four fall

1999
1999 English local elections
1990s in Lancashire